Atla oulankaensis is a rare species of saxicolous (rock-dwelling) lichen in the family Verrucariaceae. It has been recorded in Finland and in the Canadian arctic, growing on calciferous rock and on high-pH soil.

Taxonomy
The lichen was formally described as a new species in 2016 by Juha Pykälä and Leena Myllys. The species epithet oulankaensis refers to the type locality, which is, according to the authors, "one of the lichenologically most valuable areas in Finland". It has also been collected from Banks Island in the Canadian Arctic Archipelago, where it was growing on high-pH soil.

Molecular analysis of the internal transcribed spacer DNA regions suggests that Atla alaskana is the closest relative of A. oulankaensis, although they are readily distinguished by differences in morphology and ecology.

Description
The lichen has a thin, grey to greyish-green thallus that is often covered with cyanobacteria from genus Nostoc. These cyanobacteria sometimes form structures called cephalodia. The perithecia are 0.30–0.38 mm in diameter with a pale to dark, depressed ostiole that is 30–100 μm wide. Ascospores number eight per ascus, and are dark brown, muriform (divided into chambers by 12–16 transverse septa and 4–6 longitudinal septa), and typically measure 51–69 by 23–28 μm.

References

Verrucariales
Lichen species
Lichens described in 2016
Lichens of Northern Europe
Lichens of Subarctic America